Muhammad Khairul Akmal Bin Rokisham (born 28 May 1998) is a Malaysian professional football player who plays as a defender for Penang in the Malaysia Super League.

Club career
On 7 May 2017, Akmal  made his first-team debut for  Penang coming on as a substitute for Zulkhairi Zulkeply in the 83rd minute of 1–2 loss match against Felda United at Penang State.

Career statistics

Club

Honours
Penang FA
 Malaysia Premier League :2020

References

External links
 

Living people
1998 births
Malaysian footballers
People from Penang
Malaysian people of Malay descent
Penang F.C. players
Association football midfielders